Dominów  is a village in the administrative district of Gmina Mełgiew, within Świdnik County, Lublin Voivodeship, in eastern Poland.

The village has a population of 680.

References

Villages in Świdnik County